Fort Nonsense may refer to:

 Fort Nonsense (Annapolis, Maryland), listed on the National Register of Historic Places
 Fort Nonsense (Morristown, New Jersey)
 Fort Nonsense (Erie County, Ohio), nickname for a War-of-1812 encampment in northern Ohio
 Fort Nonsense, Virginia
 Fort Nonsense, an alternative name for Fort Bonneville in Wyoming